Protoreaster nodosus, commonly known as the horned sea star or chocolate chip sea star, is a species of sea star found in the warm, shallow waters of the Indo-Pacific region. They are sometimes seen in the marine aquarium trade or dried and sold as curios.

Description

P. nodosus possess rows of spines or "horns"; black conical points arranged in a single row, radially on the dorsal side, which may erode and become blunt. These dark protrusions are used to scare away possible predators, by looking frightening or dangerous. On the ventral side, tube feet, purple in color (or pale, transparent pink), are arranged in rows on each arm. The sea stars are usually colored in shades of red or brown, but can be light tan, the color of cookie dough. This appearance, combined with the small horns on its dorsal side, give the sea star a look similar to that of a bumpy cookie.

Habitat and behavior
Horned sea stars prefer sheltered, sandy or slightly muddy bottoms to hard substrata such as coral reef, and are frequently sighted conspicuously between the leaves of seagrasses on sea grass meadows or on blank stretch of coral sand. In shallow water, this species can be seen intertidally, occasionally exposed to the low tide. They do not withstand rapid changes well, however, and usually keep themselves underwater. Sometimes, many individuals of this species can be seen gathering on soft bottom with reason not very well known, probably to increase the chance of fertilization when spawning or simply a suitable feeding ground.

Horned sea stars seem to be opportunistic carnivores; adults are known to prey on most sessile life forms including hard corals and sponges in aquarium. In this same setting, they will hunt down snails and eat them. An individual of horned sea star also has been observed eating a sea urchin in their natural habitat.

As with other tropical echinoderms, commensal animals like shrimps (of genus Periclimenes), tiny brittle stars and even juvenile filefish can be found on the surfaces of a horned sea star. This may be attributed to its protective nature, as there are few predators that would dare to eat this echinoderm.

Overharvesting
In many tropical Asian and Pacific countries, where horned sea stars are collected for sea shell trade, overharvesting reduces greatly the population of the echinoderms. A related species, the Atlantic Oreaster reticulatus, commonly known as Bahama Sea Star, is also a once-abundant species reduced in number due to the continuous harvesting by the industry and tourists alike.

References

Bibliography

External links 

 Wild Fact Sheet's fact sheet for Protoreaster nodosus
 

Oreasteridae
Animals described in 1758
Taxa named by Carl Linnaeus
Fauna of the Pacific Ocean